John Luke Hill Jr. (October 9, 1923 – July 9, 2007) was an American lawyer, Democratic politician, and judge. He is the only person to have served as Secretary of State of Texas, Texas Attorney General, and Chief Justice of the Texas Supreme Court.

Early life
He was born in Breckenridge, the seat of Stephens County to the west of Fort Worth, to Mr. and Mrs. John Luke Hill, Sr. He grew up in Kilgore in Gregg County near the East Texas oil fields.

Career

Legal career
After attending Kilgore College, Hill received his undergraduate degree from the University of Texas in Austin, Texas, where he was a member of the Texas Cowboys. In 1947, he earned an LL.B., graduating with honors, from the University of Texas School of Law. Hill was admitted to the Texas bar the same year and went to work for a small law firm in Houston which gave him experience in trial work. In 1951, he founded his own Houston-based firm specializing in plaintiff's trial work. He was considered one of the top lawyers in Texas.

Hill won $3.5 million from Lockheed and $8.5 million from Braniff in lawsuits during the early 1960s. He was known for mastering his brief and for his down-to-earth style as an advocate.

Political career

Hill's career in politics started as a county campaign manager for John B. Connally, Jr., in Harris County during the 1964 gubernatorial campaign. Connally appointed him Secretary of State in 1966 and he served until 1968. That year he ran in the Democratic primary for governor, but the nomination and the election went to sitting Lieutenant Governor Preston Smith of Lubbock. Smith defeated a strong primary field that also included Waggoner Carr, the former attorney general who had lost the U.S. Senate race in 1966 to Republican John G. Tower; Dolph Briscoe, a future governor and wealthy landowner from Uvalde; liberal leader Don Yarborough of Houston, and Eugene Locke, the former deputy ambassador to South Vietnam whose campaign was managed by a Connally brother, Merrill I. Connally of Floresville.

In 1972, Hill was nominated as attorney general when he upset the incumbent Crawford Martin by 100,000 votes in the Democratic primary. It was a year in which Texas incumbents fared particularly poorly in state races. His most significant achievement was persuading the Legislature of Texas to support a deceptive trade practices act providing triple damages for victims of unfair trade practices.

He also played a leading role in closing down the Chicken Ranch in Fayette County, the inspiration for The Best Little Whorehouse in Texas. Hill had a subordinate leak material to reporter Marvin Zindler who ran a week-long series of special reports on The Chicken Ranch putting pressure on Governor Dolph Briscoe. After Briscoe turned to him for advice, Hill suggested that Briscoe call the sheriff of Fayette County who closed down the Chicken Ranch. Hill served as Attorney General until 1979.

Hill challenged Briscoe in 1978 in the Democratic primary and was successful but lost in the general election to Republican Bill Clements. Hill was the first Texas Democrat since 1869 to lose a gubernatorial general election to a Republican nominee.

Chief Justice of Texas

Hill practiced law until 1984 when he was elected as Texas Supreme Court Chief Justice to succeed the retiring Jack Pope. During this period, there were concerns about ethics of the courts which brought about a legislative committee investigation. The State Commission on Judicial Conduct chastized two justices and CBS's 60 Minutes offered a story on lawyers who practice in the courts making large donations to campaigns. Hill championed reform of the partisan election of judges and argued that judges should be selected based on merit, similar to the system used at the federal level.

In a news conference in August 1988, Hill announced that he was leaving the chief justice position with three years remaining in his six-year term. He claimed that the partisan election of judges was "creating a perception of impropriety" and that he planned to devote his time to reforming the judicial system.

Later life

In 1997, Governor George W. Bush called Hill from retirement to ask him to become a member of the Texas Lottery Commission following a scandal.

Hill died in 2007 after undergoing heart surgery in St. Luke's Episcopal Hospital in Houston. He was survived by his wife of sixty-one years, Bitsy Hill. Their son, John Graham Hill, and son-in-law, Michael Warren Perrin (born ca. 1948 and the husband of daughter Melinda), are trial attorneys in Houston. A second daughter, Martha Hill Jamison, is a justice of the Fourteenth Court of Appeals in Houston. Hill also had ten grandchildren and ten great-grandchildren.

References
Companion site to biography of Hill, John Hill for the State of Texas

External links 
 

1923 births
2007 deaths
People from Breckenridge, Texas
People from Kilgore, Texas
University of Texas at Austin alumni
Texas lawyers
Politicians from Houston
People from Harris County, Texas
Texas Democrats
Secretaries of State of Texas
Texas Attorneys General
Chief Justices of the Texas Supreme Court
20th-century American judges
20th-century American lawyers